Charlotte Bray (born 1982) is a British composer.  She was championed by the Royal Opera House Covent Garden, London Sinfonietta and Birmingham Contemporary Music Group, BBC Symphony Orchestra.  Her music has been performed by many notable conductors such as: Sir Mark Elder, Oliver Knussen, Daniel Harding, and Jac van Steen.

Biography
Charlotte Bray was born in Oxford in 1982 and was brought up in High Wycombe, Buckinghamshire. She studied cello and composition at Birmingham Conservatoire, graduating with First Class Honours having studied with Joe Cutler. She then completed an MMus in composition with Distinction at the Royal College of Music, where she studied with Mark Anthony Turnage. She participated in the Britten-Pears Contemporary Composition Course in 2007 with Oliver Knussen, Colin Matthews, and Magnus Lindberg; and studied at Tanglewood Music Centre in 2008 with John Harbison, Michael Gandolfi, Shulamit Ran and Augusta Read Thomas. In 2011 Charlotte is an Honorary Member of Birmingham Conservatoire and was named as their Alumni of the Year 2014 in the field of Excellence in Sport or the Arts. Awarded the Royal Philharmonic Society Composition Prize 2010 resulted in a piano quartet commission for Cheltenham International Music Festival for which Charlotte wrote Replay. She was also winner of the 2014 Lili Boulanger Prize.

Bray was appointed apprentice Composer-in-Residence with Birmingham Contemporary Music Group/Sound and Music for 2009/10, during which time violinist Alexandra Wood and the BCMG gave the première of her violin concerto Caught in Treetops under conductor Oliver Knussen. Her orchestral work Beyond a Fallen Tree was performed by the London Symphony Orchestra under Daniel Harding (UBS Soundscapes Pioneers commission), 23 May 2010. Her song cycle Verre de Venise (tenor, piano, string quartet), was co-commission by Aldeburgh, Aix-en-Provence and Verbier Festivals in 2010. Her Scenes from Wonderland was commissioned by the London Philharmonic Orchestra, for soloist Jennifer Pike, and violinists from London Music Masters, 2011. As inaugural Composer-in-Residence with Oxford Lieder Festival 2011 Charlotte composed a new baritone cycle for Roderick Williams.

July 2012 saw the première of At the Speed of Stillness, a BBC Proms commission, with Sir Mark Elder conducting the Aldeburgh World Orchestra. Also, Invisible Cities, commissioned by Verbier Festival and performed by Lawrence Power and Julien Quentin; and Making Arrangements, a new chamber opera written for Tête à Tête Opera Festival, London.

In 2015 Bray's chamber opera Entanglement received its premiere from the Nova Music Opera. Charlotte collaborated with the librettist Amy Rosenthal on the story of Ruth Ellis, the last woman to be hanged in Britain. Also premiered in 2015, Out of the Ruins, commissioned by the Royal Opera House Covent Garden for their youth company, mezzo-soprano and orchestra; Come Away for the Chester Cathedral Choir; and a new work for cellist Guy Johnston.

Bray has written for some of the world's top musicians and ensembles, including the London Symphony Orchestra, London Philharmonic Orchestra, Birmingham Contemporary Music Group, City of Birmingham Symphony Orchestra, Ensemble 360, Britten Sinfonia, London Sinfonietta, The Dover Quartet, Albany and Oberon Trio's, Claire Booth, Lucy Schaufer, Jennifer Pike, Lawrence Power, Isang Enders, Johannes Thorell, Julien Quentin, Huw Watkins, and Mona Asuka Ott; and festivals, namely BBC Proms, Aldeburgh, Cheltenham, Savannah, Aix-en-Provence, Festspiele Europäische Wochen Passau, Festival 3B, and Verbier. Conductors who have performed her work include Sir Mark Elder, Oliver Knussen, Daniel Harding, and Jac van Steen.

She was in residence at the MacDowell Colony in New Hampshire summer 2013. And following this, at the Liguria Study Centre having been awarded a Bogliasco Foundation Fellowship.

Selected works

Works for orchestra or large ensemble 
 Stone Dancer for orchestra (2016)
 Falling in the Fire for solo cello and orchestra (2015)
 Fanfare for Birmingham (2014) ensemble of 8 players
 Black Rainbow for orchestra (2013)
 At the Speed of Stillness for orchestra (2012)
 Scenes from Wonderland for solo violin & orchestra (2011)
 Caught in Treetops for solo violin & large ensemble (2010)

Chamber works 
 Renga Miniatures (2007) flute, clarinet, horn, piano, violin, cello
 Trail of Light (2008) flute and viola/cello
 Three Rhapsodies (2009) clarinet quintet
 Throw Back (2009) saxophone quartet
 Midnight Interludes (2010) clarinet and cello
 Invisible Cities (2011) viola and piano
 Replay (2011) piano, violin, viola, cello
 The Sun Was Chasing Venus (2012) string quintet 
 Secret (2012) flute duet
 The Barred Owl (2013) piano duet (two pianos)
 Circling Point alto saxophone & piano (2014)
 Those Secret Eyes and That Crazed Smile (2014) piano trio
 Here Everything Shines (2015) flute and guitar
 Perseus (2015) cello and piano

Solo works 
 on the Other Shore (2014) cello
 Beyond (2013) violin
 Oneiroi (2013) piano
 Suya Dalmak (2013) cello and tape
 Off the Rails & All at Sea (2005/12) piano
 Chapter One (2012) piano
 Passing Shadows (2012) guitar
 Late Snow (2009) oboe
 Elegy for George (2005-6) viola

Vocal works 
 Midnight Closes soprano, piano, clarinet and cello (2010)
 Verre de Venise (2010) tenor, piano, string quartet
 Sonnets and Love Songs (2011) baritone, piano
 Yellow Leaves (2012) soprano, piano
 Fire Burning in Snow mezzo-soprano, oboe/cor anglais, B-flat clarinet/bass clarinet, violin, and cello (2013)

Operatic and stage works 
 The Fox and the Crow (2011) soprano, baritone, harp and cello
 Making Arrangements (2012) soprano, mezzo, tenor, baritone, flute, cor anglais, harp, violin, cello and double bass
 Out of the Ruins (2014) youth chorus, mezzo-soprano, orchestra
 Entanglement (2015) soprano, tenor, baritone, flute, clarinet/bass clarinet, percussion, violin, cello, double bass

Choral works 
 Walking with my Iguana (2007) choir and piano accompaniment
 On the Green (2013) two-part choir and piano accompaniment
 John, Tom, and James (2013) two-part choir and piano accompaniment
 Come Away (2014) a cappella SATB choir
 Agnus Dei (2014) a cappella SSATTB choir

References

External links 
 Official Charlotte Bray homepage
 Composers Edition, online works publication
 Charlotte Bray on Soundcloud
 Nicholas Dawkes Photography

1982 births
British women classical composers
Living people
English classical composers
MacDowell Colony fellows
People from High Wycombe
21st-century English women musicians
21st-century British composers
21st-century classical composers
Musicians from Oxford
Musicians from Oxfordshire
Musicians from Buckinghamshire
21st-century women composers